Gabriel Ángel Simón Aguirre  (born 15 December 1972, in Mexico City) is a Mexican football manager.

Career

Aguirre who never played professional football, assisted Pablo Marini during his coaching stay with the Atlante, Mineros de Zacatecas, Puebla, Tiburones Rojos de Veracruz and Monarcas Morelia from 2014-2017. Coached Club Puebla during 2016.

External links

Footnotes

1972 births
Living people
Club Puebla managers
Mexican football managers
Club Necaxa non-playing staff